Aarne Haapakoski (1904 – 1961) was a Finnish pulp writer. He is known for a detective fiction series about architect/detective Klaus Karma and a science fiction series about a robot named Atorox. Both series were written under the pseudonym Outsider. The Atorox Award for Finnish science fiction is named after Atorox.

References

1904 births
1961 deaths
People from Pieksämäki
People from Mikkeli Province (Grand Duchy of Finland)
Writers from South Savo
Finnish mystery writers
Finnish science fiction writers